Finnish People First is a nationalist political party in Finland. It was founded in 2018.

History
The movement splintered into numerous competing factions, one of which evolved into Finnish People First, also led by de Wit. It was registered as an association in November 2017. Soon after, the party descended into internal strife. A party conference was convened to address the issue, but only resulted in furthering the divides. The conference re-elected Marco De Wit as the party chairman, but some members of the party contested the validity of the conference. Another conference in November 2019 also brought up divisions within the party, when a group of members voted a new chair to the meeting and after meeting was partly scattered from the premises by security, disputed new chair decided the meeting would continue at a neighbouring room with large part of participants while another disputed chair decided to continue meeting at the original premises with rest of the participants. Crime report was filed after the meeting and trial will decide the legitimate board of members.

Finnish People First took part in the 2019 parliamentary election. During the campaign the party displayed campaign ads that the police is investigating for criminal content. No candidates were elected.

Ideology
Finnish People First is extreme nationalist and anti-immigration. It opposes Finland's membership in the European Union and the Eurozone, and would return to its former currency, the Finnish markka. The party opposes NATO and what it calls "harmful immigration" and "Islamization". The party has been described as far-right, although the way it describes its position on the left–right political spectrum is ambiguous.

Organization
According to established website of the party, current chairman is Marco De Wit and vice chair Olli Juntunen. The other members of the board are Tuukka Pensala, Mari Kosonen, Pekka Kortelainen, Siri Jutila, and Pasi Kallio. However, new website has been opened for the party, which has disputed these members, and claims that current chair is Riikka Salmi.

Election results

Parliamentary elections

Municipal elections

See also
 Politics of Finland
 List of political parties in Finland
 Elections in Finland

References

External links

  
 

Registered political parties in Finland
Nationalist parties in Finland
Eurosceptic parties in Finland
Political parties established in 2018
2018 establishments in Finland